= MDEF =

Computer virus

Malware details
- Technical name: MDEF
- Alias: Garfield; Top Cat
- Type: Macintosh
- Subtype: Nuisance
- Classification: Virus
- Family: Unknown
- Isolation date: May 1990
- Origin: Ithaca, New York
- Authors: Same author as CDEF

MDEF was a computer virus affecting Macintosh machines. There are four known strains. The first, MDEF A (aka Garfield), was discovered in May 1990. Strains B (aka Top Cat), C, and D were discovered in August 1990, October 1990, and January 1991, respectively.

MDEF A, B, and C can infect application files and system files, and sometimes document files as well. The D strain will infect only applications. None of the viruses were designed to do damage, but they often do. MDEF D can sometimes damage applications beyond repair.

Quick action by computer security personnel and the New York State Police resulted in identification of the author, a juvenile. This was the same person responsible for writing the CDEF virus.
